The Sotho-Tswana peoples are a meta-ethnicity of southern Africa and live predominantly in Botswana, South Africa and Lesotho.

List of clans and kingdoms